Kuf Ab is one of the 28 districts of Badakhshan province in eastern Afghanistan.  It was created in 2005 from part of Khwahan and is home to approximately 21,400 residents.
This district borders with the Districts Khwahan, Shekay, Nusay, 
Maimay, Raghistan, and with the Tajik district of 
Darvoz Gorno-Badakhshan Autonomous Province,  .

The capital of the district is village Qal`eh-ye Kuf.

See also
Darwaz

Districts of Badakhshan Province